Mohd Rosfaizul Azuar Ali (born 1 January 1986 in Pahang), is a Malaysian footballer who currently plays for Malaysia FAM League side Kuantan FA, as a goalkeeper.

Honours

Club
 Malaysia Cup: 1
 Winners (1): 2013
 Malaysia FAM League: 1
 Winners (1): 2014

References

External links
 
 Rosfaizul tekad terus kekal bersama Pahang
 Rosfaizul tekad kekal prestasi
 Penjaga gol Pahang terima RM15261.32
 tiga rebut posisi penjaga gol tokgajah
 Senarai pemain Liga Super 2011 Pahang
 Perpindahan Pemain Liga Malaysia tahun 2008

1986 births
Living people
Malaysian footballers
People from Pahang
Malaysian people of Malay descent
Association football goalkeepers
Sri Pahang FC players
Shahzan Muda FC players